Hamworthy is a ward in Poole, Dorset. Since 2019, the ward has elected 3 councillors to Bournemouth, Christchurch and Poole Council.

History 
The Hamworthy area was formerly part of two wards on Poole Borough Council; Hamworthy East and Hamworthy West. The wards were merged due to the 2019 structural changes to local government in England with the abolition of Poole Borough Council and the new creation of Bournemouth, Christchurch and Poole Council.

Geography 
The ward covers the suburb of Hamworthy, up to the border with Upton. The ward is geographically in the far west of the conurbation.

Councillors

Election results

References 

Wards of Bournemouth, Christchurch and Poole
Politics of Poole